Chhusang  (Thsug in Tibetan) is a village development committee in Mustang District in the Dhawalagiri Zone of northern Nepal. It is located on the Upper Mustang trekking route, between Tangbe and Chele, about an hour's walk north of Tangbe. It lies at the junction of the Narshing river and the Kali Gandaki.

It is surrounded by gigantic red, orange and silver gray cliffs spotted with cave dwellings. The village consists of three different hamlets: north of the Narshing river is Tangma, to the south of it is Braga, and west of Braga, towards the Kali Gandaki, is Cikyab. It is an active farming community.

Demography
At the time of the 1991 Nepal census it had a population of 860 people living in 195 individual households.

Religion and culture
In the high cliffs on the west side of the Kali Gandhi river, is an extensive area of caves called Thagsing Grangma. To the south of these is an abandoned nunnery called Gompa Gang, the “Convent Ridge”.

Galleries

References

External links
UN map of the municipalities of Mustang District

Populated places in Mustang District